Leslie Leuluaialii-Makin (born 2 January 1992) is an Australian rugby union player who currently plays as a prop for the LA Giltinis in Major League Rugby (MLR). He also represented the Canberra Vikings in the inaugural National Rugby Championship.

Career

Makin has come all the way through the ranks in the ACT, representing the region at Under 16, Schools, Under 20, State (ACT XV) and 10s level.   He was a member of the newly founded Canberra Vikings squad for the first ever National Rugby Championship season in 2014 and his performances anchoring the scrum for the Vikings earned him a Super Rugby contract with the Brumbies for 2015.

International career

Makin was a member of the Australia Under-20 side which competed in the 2012 IRB Junior World Championship in South Africa.

Personal life
Makin was born in Canberra to a Canadian father and a Samoan mother.

Super Rugby statistics

References

1992 births
Living people
Rugby union players from Canberra
Australian rugby union players
Australian people of Canadian descent
Australian sportspeople of Samoan descent
Rugby union props
Canberra Vikings players
ACT Brumbies players
Kurita Water Gush Akishima players
LA Giltinis players